The Huanglong walnut is a Chinese variety of walnut tree native to Huanglong County, Yan'an City, Shaanxi Province. This species has been cultivated in China for over 2000 years. It is a deciduous tree, up to 35 meters tall, flowering in March to April and fruiting in August to September in the Northern Hemisphere.

References

Juglans
Trees of Asia
Flora of China
Fruit trees
Food plant cultivars